"Play" is the only single released by rapper David Banner from his fourth studio album Certified. It was produced by Mr. Collipark.

Released in 2005, the single peaked at No. 7 on the Billboard Hot 100, remaining his sole top 10 hit and his best-performing single. "Play" remains David Banner's most successful and best-selling single to date, receiving the RIAA certification for Gold-level sales.

An alternate version, entitled the "Canadian Mix", features Kardinal Offishall and Solitair and appears on the single.

Track listing
 "Play" (edited album version)
 "Play" (explicit album version)
 "Ain't Got Nothing" (Canadian mix, feat. Kardinal Offishall and Solitair)
 "Play" (BET version, video)

Charts

Weekly charts

Year-end charts

Certifications

References

2005 singles
David Banner songs
Dirty rap songs
Songs written by David Banner
2005 songs
Universal Records singles